The following is a timeline of the history of the city of Yerevan, Armenia.

Prior to 20th century

 782 BCE - Settlement founded by Argishti I of Urartu.
 590s CE - Katoghike Tsiranavor Church of Avan built.
 1582 - Turks in power.
 1583 - Yerevan Fortress built.
 1615 - Town besieged by Turkish forces.
 1679 - 4 June: 1679 Armenia earthquake
 1830 - Red Bridge rebuilt.
 1837 - Tsarskaya Street opens.
 1842 - Saint Sarkis Cathedral rebuilt.
 1873 - Population: 11,938.
 1877 - Yerevan Ararat Wine Factory in operation.
 1879 - Hovhannes Ghorghanyan becomes mayor.
 1897 - Population: 28,910.

20th century

 1913 - Population: 34,000.
 1915 - Refugees from Armenian genocide begin to arrive in yerevan.
 1918 - 28 May: Yerevan becomes capital of the First Republic of Armenia.
 1920
 29 November: Bolsheviks in power.
 Yerevan becomes capital of Armenian Soviet Socialist Republic.
 Nairi Cinema opens.
 1921 - Armenian State University established.
 1924 - Art school opens.
 1926 - Population: 64,613.
 1930 - Spartak Stadium built.
 1931 - Saint Nikolai Cathedral demolished.
 1933 - Opera Theater opens.
 1934 - Golos Armenii Russian-language newspaper begins publication.
 1936
 City renamed "Yerevan."
 Moscow Cinema opens.
 Komitas Pantheon (cemetery) established.
 1939 - Population: 200,031.
 1940
 Yerevan Zoo opens.
 Statue of Lenin erected in Lenin Square.
 1949 - Pushkin Park designed.
 1959 - Souren Spandaryan Square opens.
 1965
 24 April: 1965 Yerevan demonstrations.
 Population: 623,000.
 1967
 Mother Armenia monument erected in Victory Park.
 Armenian Genocide memorial erected on Tsitsernakaberd.
 1970s - Yerevan Museum of Contemporary Art established.
 1970 - Hrazdan Stadium and Chess House open.
 1977 - Yerevan TV Tower erected.
 1979 - Population: 1,055,000.
 1980 - Yerevan Cascade built.
 1981 - Yerevan Metro begins operating; Marshal Baghramyan (metro station) opens.
 1982 - House-Museum of Aram Khachaturian opens.
 1983 - Karen Demirchyan Sports and Concerts Complex opens.
 1985 - Population: 1,133,000 (estimate).
 1987 - Garegin Nzhdeh Square (metro station) opens.
 1988
 18–26 February: Major demonstration held in Yerevan demanding the unification of Karabakh with Armenia.
 22 March: Demonstration.
 26 March: Demonstration.
 7 December: Influx of refugees following the 1988 Armenian earthquake.
 1991
 21 September: Armenian independence referendum, 1991 held.
 Azg and Yerkir newspapers in publication.
 1992
 Football Club Pyunik formed.
 Armenian Center for Contemporary Experimental Art active.
 1993 - Yerevan Stock Exchange established.
 1994 - Food demonstration.
 1996 - September: Protest following Armenian presidential election, 1996.

21st century

 2001 - Hovik Hayrapetyan Equestrian Centre opens.
 2003
 Yervand Zakharyan becomes mayor.
 Armenian International Policy Research Group headquartered in city.
 2004
 Yerevan International Film Festival begins.
 Yerevan City Hall built.
 2007 - Sister city relationship established with Los Angeles, USA.
 2008 - February–March: 2008 Armenian presidential election protests.
 2009 - Cafesjian Museum of Art opens.
 2011
 Yerevan Velodrome and Mordechai Navi Synagogue open.
 Taron Margaryan becomes mayor.
 Population: 1,060,138.
 2012 - City named World Book Capital by UNESCO.
 2014 - Yerevan Mall in business.
 2018 - April: 2018 Armenian protests.

See also
 Yerevan history
 History of Yerevan
 List of mayors of Yerevan
 Other names of Yerevan (e.g. Erivan, Eriwan, Iravan, Irwan, Jerewan)
 Timeline of Armenian history
 Timeline of modern Armenian history

References

Bibliography

Published in 19th century
 
 
 
 
 
 
 
 
 

Published in 20th century
 
 
 
 
 
 
 

Published in 21st century

External links

 Digital Public Library of America. Items related to Yerevan, various dates

History of Yerevan
Yerevan
yerevan
Yerevan-related lists
Years in Armenia
Yerevan